The W Broadway Local is a rapid transit service of the New York City Subway's B Division. Its route emblem, or "bullet", is colored  since it uses the BMT Broadway Line in Manhattan.

The W operates weekdays only except late nights between Ditmars Boulevard in Astoria, Queens and Whitehall Street in Lower Manhattan, making local stops along its entire route; limited rush hour service is extended beyond Whitehall Street to and from 86th Street in Gravesend, Brooklyn, making local stops in Brooklyn.

Introduced on July 22, 2001, the W originally ran at all times on the BMT West End Line and BMT Fourth Avenue Line in Brooklyn to Coney Island–Stillwell Avenue across the Manhattan Bridge, running express on the Broadway Line. It was truncated in 2004 to its current service pattern, running local on the Broadway Line to Whitehall Street until June 25, 2010, when it was eliminated due to the Metropolitan Transportation Authority (MTA)'s financial crisis. The route was later restored on November 7, 2016, using its original emblem and 2004–2010 routing, as part of the updated service pattern related to the opening of the Second Avenue Subway.

Service history

Context

The W was originally conceived as an extra Broadway Line local service running on the Astoria and Broadway lines to Whitehall Street in Manhattan. This service was essentially a variant of the  route, which in the 1970s and 1980s ran express on the Broadway Line between Forest Hills–71st Avenue in Queens and Coney Island–Stillwell Avenue in Brooklyn. At the time, some N trains (until 1976 designated EE) were designated with a diamond N bullet, ran local on Broadway, and traveled only between Forest Hills and Whitehall Street.

The Manhattan Bridge, between Manhattan and Brooklyn, contains four subway tracks: a northern pair for the IND Sixth Avenue Line and a southern pair for the BMT Broadway Line. Repairs to the bridge forced the N, which normally ran express on the Broadway Line and via the bridge, to run local via the Montague Street Tunnel starting in 1986. The south tracks were closed completely for repairs from 1988 to 2001.  This service change precluded W local service from running as envisioned. The W bullet appeared on older roll signs as a yellow diamond bullet, while newer roll signs featured the modern round bullet. The W also appeared on the digital signs of the R44s and R46s with any route and destination combination that could be used for the Broadway Line.

The W label was first used in 2001, when the two tracks on the Manhattan Bridge's northern side, which connected to the IND Sixth Avenue Line, were closed for repairs. This required the suspension of Sixth Avenue  service south of 34th Street–Herald Square as it used those tracks to travel to and from Brooklyn. The W service replaced the B on the BMT West End Line and BMT Fourth Avenue Line in Brooklyn, ran on the BMT Broadway Line in Manhattan and BMT Astoria Line in Queens. The W also replicated the split in B service from 1986 to 1988, when the bridge's north tracks were first closed, although both halves of the route were labeled .

2001–2004 
Plans for the W train were announced in late 2000, when the Metropolitan Transportation Authority announced that the Manhattan Bridge's south tracks would reopen and that the north tracks would be closed. W service began July 22, 2001. Service began operating between Coney Island and Astoria-Ditmars Boulevard, Queens, via the West End Local and Fourth Avenue Express in Brooklyn; the Manhattan Bridge south tracks; Broadway Express (switching to the local tracks to serve 49th Street) in Manhattan; and the 60th Street Tunnel and BMT Astoria Line in Queens. The W ran express on the Astoria Line during rush hours in the peak direction between 6a.m. and 9p.m., and local at all other times. Trains ran express to Manhattan between 6a.m. and 1p.m., and to Astoria from 1p.m. to 9p.m. Evening service terminated at 57th Street–Seventh Avenue in Manhattan (using the express tracks and bypassing 49th Street), while late night and weekend evening service operated as a shuttle within Brooklyn only, terminating at 36th Street during late nights and Atlantic Avenue–Pacific Street on weekends.

After September 11, 2001, all Broadway Line service in Lower Manhattan was suspended due to extensive damage caused by the collapse of the World Trade Center. As a result, the entire N route was suspended, and W trains ran at all times between Ditmars Boulevard and Coney Island. It made all stops except in Brooklyn north of 36th Street. During late nights, it ran in two sections: between Ditmars Boulevard and 34th Street, skipping 49th Street in the northbound direction, and in Brooklyn between 36th Street and Coney Island. Normal service on both routes resumed on October 28, 2001. With the December 16, 2001 timetable, two morning rush hour northbound trains terminated at 57th Street, and one evening rush hour train was put into service at 57th Street.

The Astoria express service was discontinued on January 15, 2002 because it was unpopular among Astoria residents. This change was approved by the MTA Board in December 2001. Express service was implemented on the Astoria Line in order to improve operations at the Ditmars Boulevard terminal, and because 43% of the line's riders boarded at express stations. Instead, the change yielded no operational benefits, and made local N trains overcrowded, and express W trains underutilized. N trains carried 1.9 times as many passengers as W trains in the morning, and 2.6 times as many in the evening. W express service had been suspended after the September 11 attacks to replace N service. Even after normal service resumed in October 2001, local W service was kept until November 19 on a trial basis. Analysis of the operating pattern found that the terminal could handle the all-local service pattern and that the ridership split between the N and W was more balanced.

Around that time, evening service was extended from 57th Street to Astoria.

On September 8, 2002, W service was extended to Astoria during late nights and weekends, running fully local via the Fourth Avenue and Broadway Lines and Montague Street Tunnel. This was because ongoing reconstruction of the Coney Island–Stillwell Avenue terminal left the W as the only train serving it. This change also gave the West End Line late-night service to Manhattan for the first time since 1977.

On April 27, 2003, early evening weekend service was increased from running every 12 minutes to every 8 minutes, and Sunday morning and early evening service were increased to run every 8 minutes instead of every 10 minutes.

2004–2010
When the Manhattan Bridge's north tracks were restored to service on February 22, 2004, the W was curtailed to its current service pattern, running weekdays only from 7:00 a.m. to 9:30 p.m. as an entirely local service between Astoria–Ditmars Boulevard and Whitehall Street–South Ferry, Lower Manhattan. W service between Manhattan and Queens remained, because of increasing ridership on the BMT Astoria Line. The first three W trains of the day entered service at 86th Street in Gravesend, Brooklyn and the last three trains of the night continued in service to Kings Highway. These trips ran local in Brooklyn via the Montague Street Tunnel, BMT Fourth Avenue and BMT Sea Beach lines. On July 27, 2008, the W was extended to run until 11:00 p.m. in response to growth in the subway system's ridership.

On March 24, 2010, the MTA announced the elimination of the W due to financial shortfalls. In its place, on weekdays, the  train ran local north of Canal Street while the  train was extended from 57th Street–Seventh Avenue to Astoria–Ditmars Boulevard, running local north of 34th Street–Herald Square. The W ceased operation on Friday, June 25, 2010, with the last train bound for Astoria–Ditmars Boulevard leaving Whitehall Street–South Ferry at 10:50 p.m.

2015–present 
In July 2015, the MTA announced it was considering restoring the W with its 2004–2010 service pattern once the first phase of the Second Avenue Subway opened, which would reroute the Q from the Astoria Line to 96th Street on Manhattan's Upper East Side. The W would replace the Q on the Astoria Line to maintain two services on the line weekdays.

On May 23, 2016, the MTA announced it would restore the W. Service was restored on November 7, 2016, running between 7:00a.m. and 11:00p.m. The Q was temporarily cut back to 57th Street–Seventh Avenue, allowing for a seamless extension to the Second Avenue Line, which opened on January 1, 2017. Additionally, the N train again ran express in Manhattan on weekdays from 34th Street–Herald Square to Canal Street. The W's restoration meant there would be 20 fewer trips to and from Astoria per weekday as the W ran for a shorter time span each day than the Q did. In June 2018, the MTA added service between 6:00a.m. and 7:00a.m., and between 11:00p.m. and midnight in response to overcrowded N trains during those hours. As the N and W share the same fleet from the Coney Island Yard, a small number of W trains originate or terminate at 86th Street throughout the day. These trains operate via the  Montague Street Tunnel and local along the BMT Fourth Avenue Line and BMT Sea Beach Line as they did prior to 2010.

In July 2019, the MTA introduced a proposal to end late evening service. Instead, W service would once again end around 9:30 PM. In their proposal, the MTA noted that service often ended early on weeknights to accommodate planned work.

In March 2020, the W was temporarily suspended due to lack of ridership and train crew availability caused by the COVID-19 pandemic, though full service was restored in June. On December 29, 2021, W service was again suspended due to a shortage of crew members exacerbated by the COVID-19 pandemic; service was again restored on January 24, 2022.

Route

Service pattern 
The following table shows the lines used by the W, with shaded boxes indicating the route at the specified times:

Stations 
For a more detailed station listing, see the articles on the lines listed above.

References

External links 

 
 
 

New York City Subway services